The 2022 K League 2 was the tenth season of the K League 2, the second-tier South Korean professional football league, and the fifth one under its current name, the K League 2. The top-ranked team and the winners of the promotion/relegation playoff series were promoted to the 2023 K League 1.

Promotion and Relegation

New team 
Gimpo FC, which played in the K3 League, made their professional debut on the K League 2 in the 2022 season, being the 23rd K League member.

Relegated from 2021 K League 1
 Gwangju FC was relegated back to the K League 2, after just a season in top tier.

Teams

Stadiums

Personnel and kits

Note: Flags indicate national team as has been defined under FIFA eligibility rules. Players may hold more than one non-FIFA nationality.

 The managers list above only includes the ones that managed the teams on the competition's final rounds (E.G.: If a manager was managing the club since the start of the season, and ended up being sacked with only 7 matches to play in the competition, the list will only show the manager chosen to replace him).

Foreign players
The maximum number of foreign players on the K League 2 is restricted to five players per team, including slots for a player from AFC and ASEAN countries status. A team could only use a maximum of four foreign players in each matchday. Players in bold are players who joined midway through the competition.

League table

Positions by matchday

Round 1–22

Round 23–44

 The 13th Round match between Seoul E-Land FC and Jeonnam Dragons was postponed to 8 June 2022 due to Jeonnam Dragons' participation in the 2022 AFC Champions League.
 The 28th Round matches (FC Anyang vs Daejeon Hana Citizen and Seoul E-Land FC vs Gyeongnam FC), alongside the 29th Round matches (Daejeon Hana Citizen v Jeonnam Dragons and Chungnam Asan vs Seoul E-Land) were postponed to a later date (21 September 2022 and 5 October 2022 respectively) due to the 2022 EAFF E-1 Football Championship.

Results

Promotion/relegation play-offs
There are two playoffs contested in this stage. The Playoff "1" is played with the two league extremes facing each other (K League 1 second-worst placed team against K League 2 second-best placed team). Meanwhile, the Playoff "2" is played with K League 2 10th facing the Semi-playoffs winner. The winners of both ties earn two spots in the 2023 K League 1.

If scores are tied after regular time in any match of both the Semi-playoffs and playoffs, the higher-placed team will advance to the next phase. However, The same conditions do not apply for the promotion/relegation playoffs, with the match, if tied, requiring extra time. Should it remain tied, the match will go to the penalty shoot-outs. (The away goals rule is no longer applied.)

Semi-playoff

Playoff

Promotion-Relegation Playoff Final Round

Matches

First leg

Second leg

Suwon Samsung Bluewings won 2-1 on aggregate and retained their K League 1 spot, while Anyang remained in K League 2.

Daejeon Hana Citizen won 6-1 on aggregate and was promoted to K League 1, while Gimcheon Sangmu was relegated to K League 2.

Season statistics

Goals

Assists

Awards

Most Valuable Player of the Round

Season Awards
The 2022 K League Awards was held on 24 October 2022.

K League 2 Most Valuable Player

The K League 2 Most Valuable Player award was won by  Ahn Young-kyu (Gwangju FC).

K League 2 Young Player

The K League 2 Young Player award was won by  Eom Ji-sung (Gwangju FC).

K League 2 Top Scorer

The K League 2 Top Scorer award was won by  Yu Kang-hyun (Chungnam Asan).

K League 2 Top Assistor

The K League 2 Top Assistor award was won by  Maxwell Acosty (FC Anyang).

K League 2 Best XI

K League Manager of the Year
The K League Manager of the Year award was won by  Lee Jung-hyo (Gwangju FC).

See also
 2021 K League 1
 2022 K League 1

Notes

References

External links
 Official K League website

K League 2 seasons
2
K